Bull is the second album by the Canadian band Bootsauce, released in 1992. "Love Monkey #9", "Whatcha' Need" and "Big, Bad & Groovy" were released as singles. The album was nominated for a Juno Award, in the "Best Album Design" category.

Production
The album was produced by Michael Jonzun and the band. Bootsauce shared in the songwriting. "Love Monkey #9" is about animal testing on non-human primates. "Big Bad & Groovy" employs a horn section. Lemmy sang on "Hold Tight".

Critical reception

The Gazette noted that "there is more of everything—sex, danceability, power chords, smooth balladry, samples, with singer Drew Ling's insinuating voice living up to its owner's name." The Globe and Mail wrote: "Bootsauce bounds all over the musical map, mulching early Pink Floyd sci-fi rock with Public Enemy-styled rapping ('Touching Cloth'), emulating Extreme on the ballad 'What Cha' Need', resurrecting Dr. John on the New Orleans-styled 'Dog Pound', and paying tribute to Sly and the Family Stone." The Edmonton Journal determined that "assertive hard rock lays the foundation for snippets of soul falsetto, New Orleans gumbo and busy, Frank Zappa-ish orchestration."

Track listing 
All songs were written by Bootsauce, except where noted.

 "Love Monkey #9" – 3:25
 "Touching Cloth" – 3:42
 "Whatcha' Need" – 5:09
 "Big Bad & Groovy" – 4:08
 "Dogpound" – 3:35
 "Outhouse Quake" – 4:23
 "The 13th Psalm" – 4:30
 "Misunderstood" – 3:46
 "Rollercoaster's Child" (Willy Beck, Leroy Bonner, Marshall Jones, Pierce, Clarence Satchel, James Williams) – 3:31
 "I Saw You There" – 4:04
 "The Whole of You" – 4:01
 "Bad Dinner" – 3:45
 "Hold Tight" – 4:15

Personnel 

 Drew Ling (vocals)
 Pere Fume (guitar)
 Sonny Greenwich, Jr. (guitar)
 Alan Baculis (bass)
 John Lalley (as Johnny Frappe) (drums)
 Lemmy (guest vocals on 'Hold Tight')

References 

Bootsauce albums
1992 albums
PolyGram albums